Naval Air Facility El Centro or NAF El Centro  is a United States Navy Naval Air Facility located approximately six miles (10 km) northwest of El Centro, in Imperial County, California. NAF El Centro is under the jurisdiction of Navy Region Southwest and serves both as temporary homeport to military units conducting air-to-air and bombing training, and as the winter training home of the Blue Angels aerobatics display team.

Founded in 1946 as Naval Air Station El Centro, the facility had previously been the site of a World War II era Marine Corps Air Station. In 1979, the facility was given its current designation as a Naval Air Facility.

History
In 1941 the Civil Aeronautics Administration offered to replace the small airport in Imperial, California with a larger complex consisting of two 4,500ft runways. After the outbreak of World War II, the U.S. Navy leased the new airport and an adjacent 749 acres for additional construction.  During this time the runways were extended and a third one was added. The expansion of MCAS El Centro was done by Vinson & Pringle and Del E. Webb Construction Company out of Phoenix, Arizona. MCAS El Centro was commissioned on July 23, 1943.  During the war the air station was used as a training base for new squadrons and as a facility for squadrons returning from overseas to reorganize and begin preparing to deploy again.  On March 15, 1945 a Marine Corps Aerial Gunnery School was opened. MCAS El Centro was decommissioned on May 1, 1946, the same day it was taken over by the Navy for use as a Naval Air Station. Fleet Air Gunnery Unit was opened. Through the years, Navy El Centro has had several names: Naval Air Facility, Naval Auxiliary Landing Field, Naval Air Station, and the National Parachute Test Range.

For the first 35 years, the mission of NAF El Centro was devoted to aeronautical escape system testing, evaluation, and design. In November 1947, the Parachute Experimental Division from Naval Air Station Lakehurst, New Jersey moved to El Centro. In 1951, the Joint Parachute Facility was established and consisted of the Naval Parachute Unit and the U.S. Air Force (USAF) 6511th Test Group (Parachute). The USAF remained part of El Centro's test organization for the next 27 years.

Current operations
The facility has two operating runways. It is equipped with a fresnel lens optical landing system (FLOLS) at each approach end, as well as lit aircraft carrier flight deck landing areas at both ends, so pilots can simulate carrier landings.

Apart from touch-and-go landings and take-offs, aircrews use the many ranges at NAF El Centro to develop their skills. A remote-controlled target area allows naval aviators and naval flight officers to practice ordnance delivery. The desert range is used for air-to-ground bombing, rocket firing, strafing, dummy drops and mobile land target training. The target complex uses the Weapons Impact Scoring System that microwaves target images to a range master control building for immediate verification of weapons delivery accuracy.

The addition of the Display and Debriefing Subsystem, known as DDS, expanded the role of NAF El Centro to include air combat training by utilizing remote television, acoustical and laser scoring systems. The DDS is linked with the Tactical Air Crew Training System (TACTS) to provide a computerized record of the tactics employed by individual aircrews to employ and to evaluate the effectiveness of each maneuver.

The facility is also home to the British Joint Helicopter Force (US) which is part of Joint Helicopter Command.

Air show
NAF El Centro is the winter home of the U.S. Navy Flight Demonstration Squadron, The Blue Angels. NAF El Centro historically kicks off the Blue Angels' season with their first air show.

Demographics

The United States Census Bureau has designated the Naval Air Facility, under the name El Centro Naval Air Facility, as a separate census-designated place (CDP) for statistical purposes, covering the residential population. It first appeared as a CDP in the 2020 Census with a population of 280.

2020 census

Note: the US Census treats Hispanic/Latino as an ethnic category. This table excludes Latinos from the racial categories and assigns them to a separate category. Hispanics/Latinos can be of any race.

In popular culture

Much of the movie Jarhead was filmed around El Centro, and many of the extras from the movie were from NAF El Centro.

In the beginning of the 1990 movie Revenge, Kevin Costner plays an F-14 Tomcat pilot stationed at El Centro.

See also 
 Fleet Air Gunnery Unit Pacific
 List of United States Navy airfields

Notes

References

Books

Websites
Naval Air Facility El Centro (official site) Retrieved 2022-01-07.
Naval Air Facility El Centro GlobalSecurity.org. Retrieved 2022-01-07.
History of Naval Air Facility El Centro (California State Military Museum) Retrieved 2022-01-07.

External links

El Centro, Naval Air Station
Installations of the United States Navy in California
Airports in Imperial County, California
Buildings and structures in Imperial County, California
El Centro metropolitan area